Concert of Angels  is a work of El Greco in oil on canvas from 1608, during his last period in Toledo, Spain. It is exhibited at the National Gallery in Athens.

Created at the end of his life, art historians have disputed whether this painting is a finished work or part of a working study for a commission of the Annunciation for the chapel of the Hospital de Tavera. It is not an independent composition but a cut-down fragment of the whole. It shows a celestial choir of angels, some of them with their backs to the viewer. Designed to hang high above the head of the viewer, the very extended heads and the anatomy of the characters show the influence of Michelangelo, though there are probably retouchings by Jorge Manuel Theotocópuli, the son of the painter. It once formed part of a threesome of paintings for the chapel. It is unknown when the paintings were removed from the chapel. It is also unknown when this painting was cut down, but Tiziana Frati assumes it was done in the latter half of the 19th century. Stylistically it is similar to the concert of angels seen at the top of El Greco's annunciation in the Prado.

References

Bibliography 
 Álvarez Lopera, José. El Greco.  Madrid: Arlanza, 2005. .
 Scholz-Hänsel, Michael. El Greco.  Colonia: Taschen, 2003. .

External links 
 Concierto Of ángeles ArteHistoria.Like (Spanish)

Paintings by El Greco
1608 paintings
Angels in art
Books in art
Musical instruments in art